Sunrise is a city in central-western Broward County, Florida, United States, and is a principal city of the Miami metropolitan area. As of the 2020 census, the city had a total population of 97,335.

Sunrise was incorporated in 1961 and founded by Norman Johnson, a developer whose Upside-Down House attracted buyers to what was then a remote area.

History

Early history

In 1960, Iowa-born developer Norman Johnson paid $9 million for 2,650 acres of land in southwestern Broward County. By 1961, this community of 1.75 square miles—which Johnson named Sunrise Golf Village—had fewer than 350 residents.

It has been reported that the community was to be named Sunset Village—but this did not occur because of objections from residents who felt that "sunset" was too final. (Originally called "Sunset," the name did not sit well with the retirees whom developers wanted to attract, so a change was made to "Sunrise.")

Johnson and F. E. Dykstra developed and built an "upside-down house" to lure prospective property buyers. The home was completely furnished, and the carport featured an upside-down automobile. Public interest was aroused through numerous news stories—including a feature in Life magazine. The structure became a national attraction that drew thousands to the Village. People came to stand on the ceiling—and many stayed to make their home in the community.

In 1961, Norman Johnson was appointed by Governor C. Farris Bryant as the first Mayor of Sunrise Golf Village.

According to "City of Sunrise Golf Village," a booklet produced by the City in 1969: "On January 10, 1967, (a date called for by City Charter) Sunrise Golf Village emerged from a developer's operation into a free city under complete control of its residents. Also, on this auspicious date, the City elected a Mayor and seven Councilmen to four-year terms of office. The City of Sunrise Golf Village which comprises 3 1/2 square miles, has no air pollution or drainage problems, all paved streets, and street lighting throughout the entire City."

That first elected mayor was John Lomelo Jr.—a former Miami nightclub owner who was drawn to Sunrise Golf Village by the Upside-Down House.

Growth

Originally known as Sunrise Golf Village, the City had a population of 4,300 and comprised just 1.75 square miles by 1967. Then, during the 1970s—as Broward County began to push west—the City experienced its first real growth.

In 1971, the City, by referendum, changed its name to the City of Sunrise. Through annexation, Sunrise eventually expanded to its current boundaries—encompassing more than 18 square miles, reaching the Everglades and dropping south of I-595/State Road 84. The City is situated approximately six miles west of Fort Lauderdale, and is adjoined by the communities of Weston, Davie, Tamarac, Lauderhill, and Plantation.

By October 1984, the City had reached an estimated population of 50,000. In the mid-1980s, growth gave way to challenges, as the City was faced with financial difficulties, limited economic opportunities and a lack of adequate civic amenities. In the early 1990s, Sunrise worked to put its financial house in order, rebuild its infrastructure and establish itself as a center for business headquarters. It is the site of Sawgrass International Corporate Park—at 612 acres, the largest corporate park in south Florida.

In 1990, the first phase of Sawgrass Mills opened in Sunrise. Due to its continued popularity and expansion, the shopping and entertainment center has grown to almost 2.3 million square feet. It features 350 outlet and value retailers; food courts and full-service restaurants; movie theater and family entertainment venues.

The National Car Rental Center—now the FLA Live Arena—opened its doors in 1998. The arena is the home of the National Hockey League's Florida Panthers, and hosts top entertainers and events.

Thanks in large part to these shopping and entertainment destinations, Sunrise has become one of Florida's top tourist draws. Its location at the center of Miami-Dade, Broward and Palm Beach counties—in close proximity to the Florida Turnpike and I-95, and bordered by the Sawgrass Expressway, I-75 and I-595—makes Sunrise accessible to area residents and visitors alike.

Sunrise operates its own utility services (water, wastewater, and natural gas), as well as municipal fire-rescue and police departments. The City also maintains its own system of parks, as well as a soccer club, golf course, tennis club, playgrounds and swimming pools. The Sunrise Civic Center includes a 300-seat theater, an art gallery, an athletic club, and banquet facilities. Sunrise is also home to eleven public schools.

Google Maps loss incident

In September 2010, Sunrise was "lost" by Google Maps. Individuals attempting to get driving directions or locate a business in Sunrise were redirected to Sarasota, Florida. This was the third time this occurred in Sunrise's history.

Recent history

On February 2, 2021, a shootout occurred between a gunman and several FBI agents at an apartment complex in Sunrise. At the time, the agents were serving a federal warrant related to a child exploitation case. Two FBI agents were fatally shot and three others were injured. The gunman, who was the subject of the warrant, was later found dead after barricading himself inside the apartment. The shootout was the most violent incident in the FBI's history since the 1986 shootout that left two agents dead and five others injured, and it was also the first time an agent was fatally shot in the line of duty since 2008.

Demographics

2020 census

As of the 2020 United States census, there were 97,335 people, 39,427 households, and 22,112 families residing in the city.

2010 census

As of 2010, there were 37,609 households, with 13.6% being vacant. As of 2000, 33.4% had children under the age of 18 living with them, 48.6% were married couples living together, 13.8% had a female householder with no husband present, and 33.2% were non-families. 27.2% of all households were made up of individuals, and 14.4% had someone living alone who was 65 years of age or older. The average household size was 2.54 and the average family size was 3.12.

In the city, the population was spread out, with 24.9% under the age of 18, 7.3% from 18 to 24, 31.7% from 25 to 44, 18.4% from 45 to 64, and 17.7% who were 65 years of age or older. The median age was 37 years. For every 100 females, there were 87.9 males. For every 100 females age 18 and over, there were 82.5 males.

The median income for a household in the city was $40,998, and the median income for a family was $47,908. Males had a median income of $35,706 versus $28,147 for females. The per capita income for the city was $18,713. About 7.3% of families and 9.7% of the population were below the poverty line, including 12.3% of those under age 18 and 12.5% of those age 65 or over.

2000 census
As of 2000, speakers of English as a first language accounted for 71.92%, while Spanish was 16.75%, French Creole was at 2.53%, Yiddish at 1.14%, Portuguese at 1.01%, Italian at 0.84%, French at 0.83%, Hebrew at 0.61%, and Chinese at 0.59% of the population.

As of 2000, Sunrise had the 107th highest percentage of Cuban residents in the US, at 2.29% of the city's population, and the sixtieth highest percentage of Colombian residents in the US, at 2.44% of the city's population (tied with Weehawken, New Jersey.) It also had the fourteenth most Jamaican-populated area in the US, with 7.6% of all residents, and the fifty-third highest concentration of Haitians (tied with Lake Alfred and Miami Gardens' Bunche Park neighborhood) at 2.8% of the population.

Economy

Sunrise's tax base includes BB&T Center, Sawgrass Mills, Sawgrass International Corporate Park, IKEA and other commercial developments. Quality job creation through corporate attraction has long been a priority in the City.

Sunrise includes branches of Coventry Healthcare; AT&T – Regional HQ; United Healthcare; Mednax – HQ; HealthTrust Workforce Solutions – Corp HQ: BlackBerry; General Dynamics; Broadspire – HQ; Publix; Interim Services; FoxConn; Andrx; BHA Engineering – HQ; HG Holdings – HQ; MDR Fitness – HQ; S&B Industry – HQ; Grant Thornton – Regional HQ; Cigna Healthcare; Norwegian Cruise Line (NCL); Marsh Insurance – Regional HQ; CoreLogic; New York Life; Pet Supermarket – HQ; T-Mobile; Sunshine Health – HQ; International Bullion Brokers – HQ; Bolton Medical – U.S. HQ; Synergistix – HQ; HBO – Latin America HQ; GL Homes – HQ; Prudential Florida Realty – HQ; Federal-Mogul – South America HQ; Martin Professional – U.S. HQ; E. & J. Gallo Winery – South America HQ; Chubb Insurance – Latin America HQ; Wendy's – Latin America HQ; IKEA; American Express Headquarters.

Air France's United States reservations call center is located in the Sawgrass Technology Park in Sunrise.

CIGNA Healthcare has a large service and operations center in Sunrise.

Emerson Electric Company announced on July 26, 2011 that it would locate its Latin America headquarters at Sawgrass International Corporate Park.

The City of Sunrise announced a New Homebuyer Incentive Program on January 20, 2012. Under this innovative new program, The City of Sunrise will reimburse homebuyers up to $2,000 for select improvements to a newly purchased single-family foreclosure or short sale home. The new program is an effort to attract new residents to Sunrise - and benefit existing residents by helping to improve the appearance and property values in Sunrise neighborhoods.

Arts and culture

Sunrise hosts events throughout the year in celebration of holidays, seasons and other occasions. Highlights include:

Earth Day Festival: This celebration of green living sponsored by the city's Utilities Department. The Earth Day Festival features live music; children's rides and activities; a farmer's market; unique, handcrafted goods, ethnic and traditional foods, and eco-conscious organizations. Giveaways include BPA-free water bottles that can be filled throughout the day at the City's complimentary water station.
 
Cultural Festival: Designed to celebrate, highlight and unify the diverse cultures represented in the City, the festival showcases multi-ethnic foods, music, art, and dance. This event is held each November in City Park.
 
Harvest Festival: Held each October, this festival includes costume contests, horse-drawn hayrides and an old fashioned pumpkin patch.
 
Fourth of July Parade & Fireworks: This regional celebration begins with a patriotic parade, followed by a family-friendly party with free food, rides and live entertainment. The evening's events – made possible by a public/private partnership with the former Bank Atlantic Center, now BB&T Center – include fireworks and live music.

Woodstock: This annual event features hand-made crafts from local artists. Held the first weekend in December, it is a popular event and also features local musical talents, among other entertainment.

Sports
Sunrise's FLA Live Arena is the home of the Florida Panthers of the National Hockey League. The arena also hosts concerts, circuses, ice shows and other events. The venue's 2011 first-quarter, non-hockey attendance numbers ranked No. 4 in the United States and No. 17 in the world based on calculations by entertainment trade publication Pollstar.

In 2015, the local girls youth soccer club Sunrise l9veSC recorded 3 state championships out of 6 age groups (U14, U15, and U17). In 2016, the U15 and U17 teams qualified for the US Youth Soccer National League with the U15 finishing second and the U17 finishing third.

In 2010, Sunrise finished the complete renovation and rebranding of its executive course, Seven Bridges at Springtree Golf Club. The 67-acre facility first opened in 1972. It now features a 7,000-square-foot clubhouse with a pro shop, locker rooms and a 120-seat dining area available for breakfast, lunch and catered events.

The City also operates the 15-court Sunrise Tennis Club, three pools, and more than 250 acres of park land.

The Sunrise Suns Wheelchair Basketball Team originally began as a recreational team under the umbrella of Spinal Cord Injury Support Group, Broward chapter. Dr Lauren Lerner, Fran Wade and Sue Krinsky all of HealthSouth Sunrise Rehabilitation Hospital as well as members of the board of directors for the Spinal Cord Injury Support Group saw a need to develop a wheelchair basketball program for the disabled.

Government

The City of Sunrise operates under a commission/manager form of government, led by a mayor and four city commissioners who are elected to four-year terms on a non-partisan basis. The deputy mayor and assistant deputy mayor are selected on a rotating basis in March of each year.

It is the commission's responsibility to set policy, establish laws and adopt the city's budget. The commission-appointed city manager oversees the day-to-day operations of Sunrise.

Commission meetings are typically conducted on the second and fourth Tuesday of each month in City Hall. Live and archived video of public meetings is available on www.sunrisefl.gov. Meetings are also rebroadcast on local Comcast Cable Channel 78.

Sunrise is a full-service city with a comprehensive array of departments, including: Finance and Administrative Services, City Attorney, City Clerk, City Manager, Community Development, Leisure Services, Information Technology, Human Resources, and Utilities.

Education
Sunrise is home to 11 public schools – eight elementary schools, two middle schools, and one high school – operated by Broward County Public Schools. Higher education is offered by nearby public and private institutions, including Broward College, Barry University and Nova Southeastern University.

Elementary schools

 Banyan Elementary School (It opened c. 1981. In 2012, a $1.3 million media center was installed.)
 Discovery Elementary School
 Horizon Elementary School
 Nob Hill Elementary School
 Sandpiper Elementary School
 Sawgrass Elementary School
 Village Elementary School
 Welleby Elementary School

Middle schools
 Bair Middle School
 Westpine Middle School
 Schools outside of the Sunrise city limits: Indian Ridge Middle in Davie, Plantation Middle in Plantation, and Tequesta Trace Middle in Weston.

High schools
 Piper High School
 Schools outside of the Sunrise city limits: Plantation High School in Plantation, Western High School in Davie.

Infrastructure
The Sunrise Utilities Department operates a water and wastewater system that spans approximately 70 miles and serves more than 200,000 residential and commercial customers. The system consists of over 500 miles of water distribution mains; over 600 miles of sewer piping and mains; 200 wastewater and pump stations; three water treatment facilities; four water re-pump facilities and three wastewater treatment plans.

The Utilities Department also oversees the sixth largest municipal gas system in Florida, serving nearly 10,000 homes and businesses.

References

External links
City of Sunrise official site

 
Cities in Broward County, Florida
Cities in Florida
Populated places established in 1961
1961 establishments in Florida